"Walls" is a song by the progressive rock band Yes, from their 1994 album Talk. Roger Hodgson, the songwriter formerly of fellow progressive rock band Supertramp, wrote "Walls" with Yes guitarist Trevor Rabin. It was a rock radio hit for the band, reaching number 24 on Billboard Hot Mainstream Rock Tracks chart. It also became Yes’ second-to-last charting single.

Details 
An earlier single, "Saving My Heart" from 1991's Union, was also originally intended as a collaboration between Trevor Rabin and Roger Hodgson. According to Rabin, "Walls" was the last track to be finished for the album.

Rabin and Hodgson wrote a lot of material together and became close friends.

"Walls" reached number 24 on the Mainstream Rock chart in 1994.

Rabin later included a pre-Yes version of the song on his album of demo recordings, 2003's 90124, where it is titled "Walls Demo 1990". Hodgson shares vocals with Rabin on the demo as well.

References 

1994 singles
1994 songs
Yes (band) songs
Songs written by Trevor Rabin
Songs written by Roger Hodgson
Songs written by Jon Anderson